Jeffery Glacier is a glacier in Denali National Park and Preserve in the U.S. state of Alaska. The glacier begins in the Alaska Range on the north side of Denali directly below the Wickersham Wall, heading northeast to join Peters Glacier after the latter's Tluna Icefall.

See also
 List of glaciers

Cited references

Glaciers of Alaska
Glaciers of Denali Borough, Alaska
Glaciers of Denali National Park and Preserve